HMHS Newfoundland was a British Royal Mail Ship that was requisitioned as a hospital ship in the World War II. She was sunk in 1943 in a Luftwaffe attack off southern Italy. At that point she was one of three ships brightly illuminated, bearing standard Red Cross markings as hospital ships, which was her function, so due protection under the Geneva Convention.

Building
Vickers, Sons & Maxim, Ltd of Barrow-in-Furness built Newfoundland for Furness, Withy & Co of Liverpool.

Civilian service
Newfoundland worked Furness, Withy's regular transatlantic mail route between Liverpool and Boston via St John's, Newfoundland and Halifax, Nova Scotia. In May 1926 she was joined by a sister ship, .

Early war service
Newfoundland spent the first part of World War II on her peacetime route, carrying wounded troops from the UK to Canada, and bringing the rehabilitated troops back home.

In April 1943 Newfoundland repatriated some Allied servicemen from Lisbon to Avonmouth, England. Among them was Flight Lieutenant John F. Leeming RAF, who had been captured with Air Marshal Owen Tudor Boyd (as his Aide-de-Camp) in 1940. His escape plan from Vincigliata PG 12 prisoner of war camp in Italy was by cleverly faking a very bad nervous breakdown case. He succeeded so well that the international medical board, with Swiss and Italian doctors, unhesitatingly accepted his case. As he describes in his book:
{{bquote|In the late afternoon (18 April 1943) we went aboard the British hospital ship Newfoundland, which was lying at the quay ready to sail for England. I walked quickly up the gangway, and as I felt my two feet touch the ship's deck I looked up - I suppose I am too sentimental - at the flag flying from the masthead. "Done it!" I said aloud.}}

Hospital ship

After the Allied invasion of Italy in September 1943, HMHS Newfoundland was assigned as the hospital ship of the Eighth Army, and was one of two hospital ships sent to deliver 103 American nurses to the Salerno beaches on 12 September. The hospital ships were attacked twice that day by dive bombers, and by evening they were joined by a third hospital ship. Concerned by a number of near misses, it was decided to move the ships out to sea and anchor there for the night. All three ships were brightly illuminated and carried standard Red Cross markings to identify them as hospital ships, and their protection under the Geneva Convention.

The bomb was launched by a Dornier Do 217 bomber belonging to KG 100. It struck on the boat deck, abaft of the bridge. The ship was only carrying two patients and 34 crew members. Communications were lost but, more importantly, the fire fighting equipment was completely shattered.  came alongside to rescue the patients, and also put a party on board to help with damage control. By now the ship had caught fire. There was another explosion and it became clear that the oil tanks had also caught fire. The injured crew left the boat and 12 crew members battled the fire for a further 36 hours. The ship was beyond repair and was towed further out to sea and intentionally scuttled the day after the attack by the destroyer . Of the people on board, six of the British staff nurses and six medical officers had been killed. One of the medical officers was Lt Col Hartas Foxton, MC 1889 - 1943 who had been a GP in Uttoxeter until the War. 
Four of the other RAMC doctors who were killed were Major Charles Ryan, RAMC 65313 aged 38, Major George Alexander Hay Adam, RAMC 108781, Major George North Watson, RAMC 75408 and Captain Harry Mathews, RAMC 157582 aged 29. The six Nurses who were killed were Matron Agnes McInnes Cheyne, QAIMNS, 206099, Sister Una Cameron, TANS, 209965 aged 31, Sister Dorothy Mary Cole, QAIMNS, 218052 aged 29, Sister Phyllis Gibson, QAIMNS, 223596 aged 31, Sister Mary Lea, TANS, 213741, aged 31, and Sister Margaret Annie O’Loughlin, QAIMNS, 234988, aged 27.

See also

 HMS Newfoundland (59) - Fiji-class cruiser 1943-1959, sold to Peru as BAP Almirante Grau 1959-1973, Capitan Quinones 1973-1979
 HMCS Newfoundland - proposed and cancelled Canada-class nuclear submarine for Canadian Forces Maritime Command

References

Further reading

External links

1925 ships
Hospital ships in World War II
Maritime incidents in September 1943
Ships sunk by German aircraft
Troop ships of the United Kingdom
World War II shipwrecks in the Mediterranean Sea
Hospital ships of the Royal Navy